Sandra Trehub (1938 — January 20, 2023) was a Canadian psychologist recognized for her research in the field of music psychology. She held the position of Professor Emeritus at the University of Toronto.

Biography 
Trehub completed her PhD in psychology at McGill University, and subsequently joined the faculty at the University of Toronto.

Trehub conducted research on the development of auditory perception among infants and young children. She also conducted research on the impacts of singing to infants in the course of caregiving. In one study, Trehub and colleagues demonstrated that infants who were sung to stayed settled for twice as long compared to when those who were spoken to.

Trehub died on January 20, 2023.

Awards 
Trehub was awarded the Society for Music Perception and Cognition Achievement Award in 2013. The citation for the award stated that Trehub's "pioneering and seminal research in developmental music cognition has been a crucial contribution" to the field of music psychology.

Selected works

References

20th-century births
Year of birth missing
2023 deaths
McGill University Faculty of Science alumni
Academic staff of the University of Toronto
Canadian women psychologists
Music psychologists